Paracerceis edithae is a species of marine isopod. It lives below the intertidal zone in the Caribbean Sea. It was first classified in 1930 after being found in Haiti but was rediscovered in 1972 in Puerto Rico.

References

Sphaeromatidae
Crustaceans of the Atlantic Ocean
Crustaceans described in 1930